Dalston railway station may refer to:

 Dalston railway station (Cumbria), in the village of Dalston, Cumbria, England
 Dalston railway station (London), a proposed station on the Crossrail 2 line, in Dalston, London, England
 Dalston Junction railway station, an inter-modal transport interchange on the East London Line
 Dalston Kingsland railway station, a station on the North London Line of the London Overground